On June 8, 2022, Nicholas Roske traveled to the home of Brett Kavanaugh, an associate justice of the United States Supreme Court, with plans to break in Kavanaugh's home, kill him, and then commit suicide. After arriving at Kavanaugh's residence, Roske called the police on himself and was arrested.

Roske told police he was frustrated with the leaked Supreme Court decision that was poised to overrule Roe v. Wade, the 1973 decision that guaranteed abortion as a right, as well as the Robb Elementary School shooting in Uvalde, Texas and the possibility of the Court loosening gun restrictions under the Second Amendment.

Incident

Roske traveled by plane from his residence in Simi Valley, California to the Washington, D.C. area. He then took a taxi cab to Kavanaugh's home in Chevy Chase, Maryland, arriving at 1:05 a.m. on June 8, 2022. He was wearing black clothing and was carrying a suitcase, a backpack, and several items and weapons: a Glock-17 pistol with ammunition, zip ties, a tactical knife, pepper spray, a hammer, a screwdriver, a nail punch, a crowbar, duct tape, a pistol light, and boots padded to be stealthy. Upon Roske's arrival, two deputy U.S. Marshals stationed outside Kavanaugh’s home saw him step out of the cab.

After arriving and seeing the deputy U.S. Marshals, Roske started walking down the street. He then texted his sister and told her his intentions; she convinced him to call 9-1-1. At 1:38 a.m., Roske called 9-1-1 and was connected with the Montgomery County Emergency Communications Center. Roske told the operator that he was having suicidal thoughts, that he was armed, and that he had traveled from California to Maryland "to kill a specific United States Supreme Court justice." He also said, "I'm standing now, but I can sit, whatever. I want to be fully compliant." When police arrived, Roske was still on the phone with the communications center, and he was arrested without incident.

Accused
Nicholas John Roske is a 26-year-old man from Simi Valley, California.

After his arrest, Roske told police he was upset about the leaked draft of Dobbs v. Jackson Women's Health Organization, which signaled the Court was positioned to overrule Roe v. Wade, the 1973 decision that declared abortion a constitutional right. He also cited the Robb Elementary School shooting and his belief that Kavanaugh would loosen gun restrictions. On internet chats, Roske wrote, "Im [sic] gonna stop roe v wade from being overturned" and that he was going to "Remove some people from the supreme court." It was later revealed that Roske spoke of killing two other conservative Supreme Court justices.

Legal proceedings
Roske has been held by authorities since his arrest on June 8, 2022. A federal grand jury indicted Roske of attempted murder of a Justice of the U.S. Supreme Court. He has pleaded not guilty.

References

2022 in Maryland
June 2022 crimes in the United States
Crimes in Maryland
Failed assassination attempts in the United States
Assassination plot
Chevy Chase, Maryland